Zambia is a landlocked country located in Southern Africa, to the east of Angola. It has a total area of 752,618 square kilometres (slightly larger than France), of which 9 220 km2 is water.

Political geography

Physical geography

Climate

Zambia has a tropical climate, modified by the altitude of the country. There is a rainy season that runs from October/November to March/April.

Terrain
The terrain of Zambia is mostly high plateau, with some hills and mountains.

Zambia is a landlocked country bordered along Zimbabwe in the south divided by Victoria Falls, Congo DR in the north, Tanzania on the northeast, Malawi on the east and Mozambique on the southeast. The general topography of the country is characterized by uplifted planation surfaces. The general elevation of the nation as a whole is tended towards west to east from the Kalahari Basin. The level of land falls from the upper Congo towards the Zambezi depression in the South forming a plateau.

Zambia lies in the watershed between DR Congo and Zambezi river systems. Leaving two provinces, all other provinces lie in the country frontier formed between the continental divide separating the Atlantic Ocean and the Indian Ocean, which traverses from DR Congo to the south of Tanzania. There are three major seasons: a cool dry season from April to August, a hot dry season from August to November and a warm wet season from November to April. The maximum heat is experienced during November, while the maximum rainfall is received during December. Lake Kariba is the man made lake in Africa and the second largest man made lake in the world and it stretches along the Southern border of the province.

Ecoregions

Nine ecoregions in four biomes are represented in Zambia, the most widespread being Miombo, Mopane and Baikiaea woodland savanna, with grasslands (mainly flooded grassland) and evergreen forest also present.

Land use

The following table describes the land use in Zambia, as of 2011.

As of 2005, 1559 km2 of land in Zambia is irrigated.

Environment

Current issues for the environment in the country include: air pollution and resulting acid rain in the mineral extraction and refining region; chemical runoff into watersheds; poaching, which seriously threatens: rhinoceros, elephant, antelope, and large cat populations; deforestation; soil erosion; desertification and lack of adequate water treatment, which presents human health risks.

Zambia is considered to be vulnerable to climate change. The main impact pathway of climate change in the country is through increasing variability in rainfall amounts during the agricultural season across the various agroecological regions, and shifts in the duration of the rainy season. Zambia is considered vulnerable to the impacts of climate change because the majority of the population rely on agriculture for their livelihoods - and changes in rainfall patterns has a negative impact due to the rainfed nature of production. Researched evidence suggested that temperature was likely to increase by 1.82oC and rainfall reduce by 0.87 percentage points by 2050. This means that the occurrence of extreme climate events such as droughts and floods would become more frequent.

Zambia is party to the following international agreements: Biodiversity, Climate Change, Desertification, Endangered Species, Hazardous Wastes, Law of the Sea, Nuclear Test Ban, Ozone Layer Protection and Wetlands. Zambia has signed, but not ratified, the Kyoto Protocol.

Extreme points 

This is a list of the extreme points of Zambia, the points that are farther north, south, east or west than any other location.

 Northernmost point: Cape Pungu, Northern province
 Easternmost point: Kongula Peak, Northern province
 Southernmost point: unnamed location on the border with Zimbabwe in the Zambezi river, Southern province
 Westernmost point: the western section of the border with Angola (Zambia does not have a westernmost point as the border here is formed by the line of longitude 22° E)

References

External links